Janie Speaks (born June 8, 1948) is an American gymnast. She competed in five events at the 1964 Summer Olympics.

References

External links
 

1948 births
Living people
American female artistic gymnasts
Olympic gymnasts of the United States
Gymnasts at the 1964 Summer Olympics
Sportspeople from Oklahoma City
21st-century American women